The Central Zone cricket team or Walton Central Zone is a first-class cricket team that represents central Bangladesh – the Dhaka Division – in the Bangladesh Cricket League (BCL). It is a composite team of two Bangladeshi first-class teams from central Bangladesh: Dhaka Division and Dhaka Metropolis. Central Zone has won the BCL twice, in the opening 2012–13 season and in the 2015–16 season.

In the 9th edition of BCL played during the 2021–22 season, they faced BCB South Zone in the finals under the captaincy of Shuvagata Hom.

Players

References

Bangladesh Cricket League
Bangladeshi first-class cricket teams
Sport in Dhaka Division
Cricket clubs established in 2012
2012 establishments in Bangladesh